Sowwah Square Tower 3 is the name of a skyscraper on Sowwah island in Abu Dhabi, the capital of the United Arab Emirates.

The building is located in the district of Sowwah Square and opened in 2011. Sowwah Square Tower 3 is 160 meters (520 feet) tall with 31 floors.

See also
 Sowwah Square Tower 1
 Sowwah Square Tower 2
 List of tallest buildings in Abu Dhabi

References

2008 establishments in the United Arab Emirates 
Buildings and structures completed in 2011 
Skyscraper office buildings in Abu Dhabi